Lieutenant General Kaiwalya Trivikram Parnaik  (born 28 June 1953) is a retired general officer of the Indian Army who is serving as  Governor of Arunachal Pradesh. He is the first person from Maharashtra who take over as General Officer in Northern Command area.

Early life and military career
Parnaik studied at the St. Aloysius Senior Secondary School, along with his brother A. T. Parnaik, also a lieutenant general, who retired as Director General Boarder Roads. He was commissioned into the Rajputana Rifles on 31 March 1972. He attended the Defence Services Staff College, Wellington. He commanded the 2nd battalion, The Rajputana Rifles (2 RajRif) in the Rajasthan Sector and in Jammu and Kashmir. He also attended the Senior Command and the Higher Command Course.

On 26 January 2003, Parnaik was awarded the Yudh Seva Medal for his command of an infantry brigade during the 2001–2002 India–Pakistan standoff. He attended the National Defence College in 2004 as part of the 44th course.

General officer
Promoted to the rank of Major General, Parnaik was appointed General officer commanding 17 Mountain Division in Sikkim. He later commanded the Indian Military Training Team (IMTRAT) in Bhutan. In 2009, Parnaik was promoted to the rank of Lieutenant General and appointed General officer commanding IV Corps in Tezpur. After a year-long tenure as GOC IV Corps, he moved to Army HQ as the Director General Perspective Planning - DG (PP). For his tenure as GOC IV Corps, on 26 January 2010, Parnaik was awarded the Uttam Yudh Seva Medal.

On 1 December 2010, Parnaik was accorded the status of Army Commander and named the Commander-designate of the Northern Command. He took over from Lieutenant General B. S. Jaswal on 1 January 2011. On 26 January 2012, he was awarded the Param Vishisht Seva Medal. After a two-and-a-half year stint as Northern Army Commander, he retired from the Army on 30 June 2013.

Governor
Parnaik was appointed as Governor by Droupadi Murmu, President of India on February 12, 2023. He was congratulated by Pema Khandu, Chief Minister of Arunachal Pradesh, Chowna Mein, Deputy Chief Minister of Arunachal Pradesh and Yogi Adityanath, Chief Minister of Uttar Pradesh for becoming Governor.

Controversy 
On 2006, he made false claims for getting free land of 12 acres from Government of Rajasthan.

References 

|-

|-

Governors of Arunachal Pradesh

Year of birth missing (living people)
Living people
National Defence Academy (India) alumni
National Defence College, India alumni